thumb|200px|William Bruges dressed as Garter King of Arms, kneels before St George, from his Garter Book
The Bruges Garter Book is a 15th-century illuminated manuscript containing portraits of the founder knights of the Order of the Garter. It was made to the order of William Bruges (c. 1375-1450), Garter King of Arms, and constitutes the first armorial covering members of the Order. It has been held since 1883 by the British Library (formerly the British Museum Library) in London under catalogue reference Stowe MS 594, indicating its former existence within the Library of the Dukes of Buckingham at Stowe House.

Origin
It was made between about 1430 to 1440, probably in London.

Description
The cover probably dates to the years following 1600, of brown leather tooled in gold-leaf with a floriated pattern, measuring 385 × 285 mm. The text is in Latin, written in a gothic and gothic cursive hand. It contains 27 full page miniatures in pen and watercolour, of which 26 depict standing knights displaying on a panel sitting on the ground to their right hand sides the heraldic escutcheons appertaining to their successors in the same Garter stall in St George's Chapel, Windsor Castle. The remaining page depicts William Bruges himself in the dress of Garter King of Arms kneeling before St George, the patron of the Order. 

The pages have been removed from their original positions and now exist mounted on  modern paper leaves. 
Folios 1–3 consist of subsequently made notes.
Folio 4 is a printed page imported from another book

Provenance

The manuscript is now held by the British Library in London. From William Bruges the manuscript passed successively to the ownerships of:
John Writhe (d. 1504), herald.
Sir Thomas Wriothesley (d. 1534), herald.
Elias Ashmole (1617–1692) from 1665
John Anstis (1669–1744)
William Bayntun (d. 1785): inscription (f. 1): bought by Meyrick for 10 guineas.
John Meyrick (d. 1805)
John Towneley (d. 1816), whose bookplate is affixed on the inside upper cover.
Richard Temple-Nugent-Brydges-Chandos-Grenville, 1st Duke of Buckingham and Chandos (1776–1839), purchased from  Towneley in  May 1816. Kept in the library of Stowe House.
Richard Temple-Nugent-Brydges-Chandos-Grenville, 2nd Duke of Buckingham and Chandos (1797–1861), who sold it in 1849 to Lord Ashburnham. 
Bertram Ashburnham, 4th Earl of Ashburnham (1797–1878)
Bertram Ashburnham, 5th Earl of Ashburnham (1840–1913), who sold it in 1883 to the British Museum with another 1,084 former Stowe manuscripts.

Illustrations
The illustrations depict the 25 Founder Knights and King Edward III the sovereign of the Order of the Garter as follows, shown in ascending order of Garter-Stall number in St. George's Chapel:

Further reading
O'Conor, Charles, Bibliotheca Ms. Stowensis: A Descriptive Catalogue of the Manuscripts in the Stowe Library, 2 vols (Buckingham: Seeley, 1818-1819), II, 552-53.
Catalogue of the Stowe Manuscripts in the British Museum, 2 vols, London, 1895-1896),vol. I, no. 594.

Notes

Sources
Catalogue of Illuminated Manuscripts, British Library

References

15th-century illuminated manuscripts
Order of the Garter
Stowe manuscripts
Illuminated heraldic manuscripts
English manuscripts